Uncial 0251 (in the Gregory-Aland numbering), is a Greek uncial manuscript of the New Testament. Paleographically it has been assigned to the 6th century.

Description 
The codex contains a small part of the 3 John 12-15 - Epistle of Jude 3-5, on 1 parchment leaf (24 cm by 22 cm). It is written in one column per page, 22 lines per page, in uncial letters.

Currently it is dated by the INTF to the 6th century.

Location 
Currently the codex is housed at the Louvre (S.N. 121) in Paris.

Text 
The Greek text of this codex is mixed. Aland placed it in Category III. 

In Jude 4 it has textual variant χαριν, like byzantine manuscripts, the alexandrian manuscripts prefer textual variant χαριτα.

See also 

 List of New Testament uncials
 Textual criticism

References

Further reading 

 C. Römer, 3 Johannesbrief 12-15 Judasbrief 3-5, in: R. Pintaudi (ed.) "Miscellanea papyrologica, Papyrologica Florentina" VII (Florence, 1980). 

Greek New Testament uncials
6th-century biblical manuscripts